The Council of Graduate Schools (CGS) is a nonprofit higher education organization with headquarters in Washington, DC.  Its mission is to advance graduate education and research. Its main activities consist of best practice initiatives, data analysis, advocacy, and global engagement.

Membership and affiliations

CGS membership includes approximately 500 universities in the United States and Canada, as well as international institutions. The Council is concerned principally with the efforts of graduate schools, particularly those providing PhD and master's programs. Its efforts do not extend to professional degrees in medicine or law. CGS member institutions annually award approximately 86% of U.S. doctorates and 60% of U.S. master's degrees.

Institutional members are principally represented by the official directly responsible for overseeing graduate programs at the university, usually the dean of the graduate school.

Corporations, nonprofit organizations, and university system offices may also join CGS as nonvoting members.

CGS is affiliated with the regional graduate associations the Conference of Southern Graduate Schools (CSGS), the Midwestern Association of Graduate Schools (MAGS), the Northeastern Association of Graduate Schools (NEAGS), and the Western Association of Graduate Schools (WAGS).

Leadership

CGS is governed by a member-elected board of directors. Members of the CGS Board of Directors are elected to one- to three-year terms.  The current president of CGS, Suzanne Ortega, began her tenure July 2014 after serving as the senior vice president for academic affairs at the University of North Carolina.

Past CGS presidents:
 Debra W. Stewart (2000 – 2014)
 Jules B. LaPidus (1984 – 2000)
 Michael J. Pelczar Jr. (1978 – 1984)
 J. Boyd Page (1970 – 1978)
 Gustave O. Arlt (1961 – 1970)

History

The Council of Graduate Schools was founded in 1961, when what was then known as the “Council of Graduate Schools in the United States” invited 100 institutions to join as founding members. These institutions were selected based on the number and variety of doctoral degrees each awarded.

In 1987 the CGS membership voted to change the organization's name to the Council of Graduate Schools and began admitting Canadian institutions as members.

Projects and Programs

Best practice initiatives 

CGS collaborates with members on initiatives that address common challenges in graduate education.  Examples of these initiatives include understanding PhD career pathways, financial literacy, challenges in degree completion and attrition, Preparing Future Faculty (launched in 1993), mental health and wellness, and scholarly integrity and the Responsible Conduct of Research (RCR).

Research and benchmarking 

CGS researches and publishes its findings on specific metrics related to graduate education, including graduate enrollment and degrees and international graduate student applications, admissions and enrollments.

Advocacy 

CGS advocates for graduate education before Congress and the Administration, working both independently and collaboratively with other national organizations to advance federal policies. Issue areas have included diversity and inclusiveness; the Higher Education Reauthorization Act; immigration reform; tax; and workforce development. CGS also provides resources and opportunities for its members to advocate on behalf of graduate education and research with campus stakeholders and policymakers.

Global engagement 

CGS hosts meetings and publishes research on global trends in graduate education as well as graduate education in a global context. Examples of its global engagement include the annual Strategic Leaders Global Summit on Graduate Education, traditionally hosted outside the U.S., and the international graduate admissions survey issued annually.

CGS also has an international membership program, whereby interested international universities may apply for membership in CGS.

Annual Meeting and Summer Workshop

The Council of Graduate Schools convenes members for two major meetings per year: an Annual Meeting in early December and a Summer Workshop and New Deans Institute held in July.

References

External links
 Council of Graduate Schools

Educational organizations based in the United States